, known until 2006 as Sukarabu Jr., is a women's football club playing in Japan's football league, Challenge League. Its hometown is the city of Oita.

Squad

Current squad
As of April 6, 2013

Results

External links 
 Hoyo Sukarabu F.C. official site
 Japanese Club Teams

Women's football clubs in Japan
2012 establishments in Japan
Sports teams in Ōita Prefecture